The 2022–23 Miami RedHawks men's basketball team represented Miami University in the 2022–23 NCAA Division I men's basketball season. The RedHawks, led by first-year head coach Travis Steele, played their home games at Millett Hall in Oxford, Ohio as members of the Mid-American Conference.   As the eighth seed in the MAC tournament they lost to Toledo in the first round to finish the season 12–20 and 6–12 in the MAC.

Previous season

The RedHawks finished the season 14–18, 8–12 in MAC play to finish in seventh place. They lost in the quarterfinals of the MAC tournament to Kent State. Following the season, the school parted ways with head coach Jack Owens.

Offseason

Departures

Incoming transfers

Recruiting class

Roster

Schedule and results

|-
!colspan=9 style=|Non-conference regular season

|-
!colspan=9 style=| MAC regular season

|-
!colspan=9 style=| MAC tournament

Source

References

Miami RedHawks men's basketball seasons
Miami RedHawks
Miami RedHawks men's basketball
Miami RedHawks men's basketball